Fernando Espinosa Barrera (born 9 May 1983) is a former Mexican football midfielder who last played for Celaya F.C. in the Ascenso MX

Club career
Espinosa plays for Club Universidad Nacional (commonly called Pumas UNAM), a Mexico City team. He joined the Pumas youth system at age 14 and worked his way through the ranks to make his Primera División debut in 2004.

On December 18, 2014, Espinosa signed for Atlante on loan from Pumas Unam on a season-long loan deal.

Honours
Pumas UNAM
 Primera División de México: Apertura 2004, Clausura 2009
 Champion of Champions: 2004
 Santiago Bernabéu Cup

External links

1983 births
Living people
Footballers from Mexico City
Association football midfielders
Mexican footballers
Club Universidad Nacional footballers
Atlante F.C. footballers
Club Celaya footballers
Liga MX players